Atamanovka is an urban locality (an urban-type settlement) and a railway station in the central part of Chitinsky District of Zabaykalsky Krai, Russia, located on the left bank of the Ingoda River,  southeast of Chita. Population:    190 (1917).

History
Atamanovvka was founded in 1852 and initially named Atamanka. Until the 1930s, Atamanovka's inhabitants lived on raising their livestock. Urban-type settlement status was granted in 1958.

Economy
A large broadcasting facility (Kruchina transmitter) for LW, MW, and SW is situated at Atamanovka.

Culture
There is a memorial honoring the explorers of space in Atamanovka.

References

External links
The Encyclopedia of Trans-Baikal. Entry on Atamanovka 

Urban-type settlements in Zabaykalsky Krai